The Treasury, fully Department of the Treasury, is the Australian Government ministerial department responsible for economic policy, fiscal policy, market regulation, and the Australian federal budget. The Treasury is one of only two government departments that have existed continuously since Federation in 1901, the other being the Attorney-General's Department.

The most senior public servant in the Treasury is the department secretary, currently Steven Kennedy who was appointed in September 2019. Ministerial responsibility for the department lies with the Treasurer, currently Jim Chalmers who took office in the Albanese government in May 2022.

History
The Australian Treasury was established in Melbourne in January 1901, after the federation of the six Australian colonies. In 1910, the federal government passed the Australian Notes Act 1910 which gave control over the issue of Australian bank notes to The Treasury and prohibited the circulation of state notes and withdrew their status as legal tender. The Treasury issued notes until 1924, when the responsibility was transferred to the Commonwealth Bank and later to Note Printing Australia, a subsidiary of the Reserve Bank of Australia.

The department is focused on developing Australian taxation system, land and income tax and economic policies.

Structure
The Treasury is divided into five groups: fiscal, macroeconomic, revenue, Corporate and Foreign investment and markets, with support coming from the Corporate Services Division. These groups were established to meet four policy outcomes.

 Effective government spending and taxation arrangements. The Treasury provides advice on budget policy issues, trends in Commonwealth revenue and major fiscal and financial aggregates, major expenditure programmes, taxation policy, retirement income, Commonwealth-State financial policy and actuarial services.
 Sound macroeconomic environment. The Treasury monitors and assesses economic conditions and prospects, both in Australia and overseas, and provides advice on the formulation and implementation of effective macroeconomic policy.
 Well functioning markets. The Treasury provides advice on policy processes and reforms that promote a secure financial system and sound corporate practices, remove impediments to competition in product and services markets and safeguard the public interest in matters such as consumer protection and foreign investment.
 Effective taxation and retirement income arrangements. The Treasury provides advice and assists in the formulation and implementation of government taxation and retirement income policies and legislation as well as providing information on material changes to taxation revenue forecasts and projections.

Financial regulation
The department works with the Australian Prudential Regulation Authority, the Australian Securities and Investments Commission and the Reserve Bank of Australia via the Council of Financial Regulators Working Group to ensure that market operators have appropriate oversight and to facilitate crisis management if required.

Secretaries to the Treasury
The Secretary to the Treasury is the public service head of the department. Below is the list of Secretaries.

Treasury’s independence
In 2008, Treasurer Wayne Swan called Secretary to the Treasury Ken Henry an "independent economic regulator," similar to the Governor of the Reserve Bank. When asked after the 2009 Budget about Treasury’s independence, Henry replied:

Forecasts
The department is legally required to provide a Pre-election Economic and Fiscal Outlook containing updated reports on the economic and fiscal outlook shortly after the issuing of a writ for a general federal election.

See also

 Henry Tax Review
 List of Australian Commonwealth Government entities

References

External links
 

Treasury
Australia, Treasury
1901 establishments in Australia
Government finances in Australia
Government agencies established in 1901